San Juan del Oro District is one of ten districts of the province Sandia in Peru.

References